KGVC-LP (94.1 FM, "Flashback 94") was a radio station licensed to Des Moines, Iowa, United States, and serves the Grand View University area. The station was owned by Grand View University. Prior to its 2007 launch, Grand View College students broadcast by leasing time over KDPS (88.1 FM).

The university surrendered KGVC-LP's license to the Federal Communications Commission (FCC) on March 13, 2015; the FCC cancelled the license the same day. KGVC-LP's leaving the air allowed KDRA-LP to go full-time on 94.1 FM; KDRA-LP itself shut down in 2019.

References

External links
 

GVC-LP
GVC-LP
GVC-LP
Radio stations established in 2007
Defunct radio stations in the United States
Radio stations disestablished in 2015
2007 establishments in Iowa
2015 disestablishments in Iowa
Defunct mass media in Iowa